Stéphane Gsell (7 February 1864 – 1 January 1932) was a French historian and archaeologist. He was a specialist in ancient Africa and Roman Algeria. His main work is L'Histoire ancienne de l'Afrique du Nord (1913-1929).

Principal publications 
1891:  Fouilles dans la nécropole de Vulci, exécutées et publiées aux frais du prince de Torlonia 1891
1893: Essai sur le règne de l’empereur Domitien 
1893: Recherches archéologiques en Algérie
1901: Les Monuments antiques de l'Algérie (2 volumes)
1902–1911: Atlas archéologique de l’Algérie 
1913–1929 Histoire ancienne de l'Afrique du Nord (8 volumes)
1922: Inscriptions latines de l'Algérie (2 volumes)
1926: Promenades archéologiques aux environs d'Alger

Bibliography 
 « Stéphane Gsell », in Je m'appelle Byblos, Jean-Pierre Thiollet, H & D, 2005, p. 253. 
 .

References

External links 
 Histoire de l'Afrique du Nord en 8 tomes et monuments antiques de l'Algérie en 2 volumes

Archaeologists from Paris
1864 births
1932 deaths
École Normale Supérieure alumni
Members of the Académie des Inscriptions et Belles-Lettres
Academic staff of the Collège de France
Linguists of Etruscan
Phoenician-punic archaeologists